Malthe Odin Engelsted (born Malta Odin on 8 August 1852 in Nivågård, Sjælland - 21 December 1930 in Faxe Ladeplads) was a Danish M.A. and painter.

Biography
His father,  was a military officer. In 1870, having studied theology for 3 years, he began attending  the Royal Danish Academy of Fine Arts, where he studied etching from 1873 to 1879. His first showing was at the  Charlottenborg Spring Exhibition in 1880.

Combining his own resources with a scholarship from the Academy, he was able to make study tours to Germany, the Netherlands, Belgium, France, Italy and Greece; spending most of the years 1887-1889 in travelling.

Much of his work is infused with humor, exemplified by Domino Players (1881) and L’hombre (1887), but he also created canvases of a more serious, psychological nature, such as Sara awakens Isaac for his departure to Mount Moriah (1884) or Christ and Nicodemus (1887).

He is buried in the cemetery at Faxe Church.

Sources
 H.R. Baumann, biography, in the first version of the DBL, published by CF Bricka, Volume 4, p. 521, Penguin Books, 1887-1905.
 A translation of the corresponding article in the Danish Wikipedia.

References

External links

 ArtNet: More works by Engelsted.

1852 births
1930 deaths
Royal Danish Academy of Fine Arts alumni
19th-century Danish painters
Danish male painters
20th-century Danish painters
19th-century Danish male artists
20th-century Danish male artists